The Fernmeldeturm Berlin (Telecommunications Tower Berlin) is a telecommunication tower located atop the Schäferberg hill in Berlin-Wannsee. The tower was built between 1961 and 1964, and is not open to the public.  Owner and operator of the site is Deutsche Funkturm (DFMG), a subsidiary of Deutsche Telekom.

Between  in elevation, the tower houses six floors for technical equipment. This currently consists of transmitters for DVB-T digital television, analog [|FM]] radio, and newer DAB and DMB digital radio. 

From 1964 to the early nineties, the tower was used to implement two over-the-horizon radio links to the rest of West Germany. The city of Berlin was geographically isolated, so unusual means were necessary to bridge the distance. One such link used bundled arrays of directional antennas mounted near the top to establish a near-line-of sight connection at 250 MHz and 400 MHz to the tower at Gartow. The other used tropospheric scatter at 2 GHz to establish a non-line-of-sight link to Torfhaus. To that end the tower was equipped with two Parabolic reflector antennas, each  in diameter, which were mounted on the lower portion of the tower. They were removed in 1996. Because of these aerials, the Fernmeldeturm Berlin had to be designed to withstand triple the wind loading of the comparably sized TV tower in Stuttgart. At the  mark, the shaft is nigh  in diameter.

Directly adjacent to the Fernmeldeturm Berlin is a free standing steel framework tower.  Formerly it supported two  diameter parabolic aerials for an over-the-horizon radio link, also to Torfhaus.  These have since been removed.  It is now predominantly used for cellular network aerials.

Since 2001, the Fernmeldeturm Berlin is also used for transmissions in the medium wave range on 1485 kHz in DRM mode. Since the tower was not designed to accommodate this frequency range, a long wire aerial was installed for this purpose.

Gallery

See also
 List of tallest towers

References

External links
 
 Picture on Google-Maps
 "Over the Top" describes Fernmeldeturm's role in the Cold War

Buildings and structures in Steglitz-Zehlendorf
Towers completed in 1964
Towers in Berlin